Kinnersley is a surname. Notable people with the surname include:

Ebenezer Kinnersley (1711–1778), American scientist
Ken Kinnersley (1914–1984), English cricketer
William Morris Kinnersley, American physicist

See also 
Thomas Kynnersley (1839–1874), British politician